Vanushi Sitanjali Walters ( Rajanayagam, born August 1981) is a New Zealand lawyer, politician and Member of Parliament in the House of Representatives for the Labour Party representing the Upper Harbour electorate.

Early life
Walters was born in August 1981 in Sri Lanka. She is the great-grand daughter of Ratnasothy Saravanamuttu, a member of the State Council of Ceylon and the first native Mayor of Colombo, and Naysum Saravanamuttu, Ceylon's second female MP. At the age of five she moved to New Zealand with her parents Jana Rajanayagam and Prithiva Rajanayagam (nee Mather).

Walters has a bachelor's degree in law from the University of Auckland and a master's degree in international human rights law from the University of Oxford.

Career

Law
Walters is a human rights lawyer and has worked in private practice, the public sector and for non-profit and community organisations. She was general manager for YouthLaw Aotearoa and a member of Amnesty International's International Board. She was a senior manager at the Human Rights Commission and was a trustee of Foundation North.

Politics

At the  Walters stood for parliament for the Labour Party in the  electorate and was ranked 22nd on the party list. She won the seat over National candidate Jake Bezzant by a final margin of 2,392 votes. She became New Zealand's first Sri Lankan-born MP.

Personal life
Walters is married to Rhys Walters and has three sons, Elliott, Luka and Sacha. She lives in Titirangi, West Auckland.

References

1981 births
Living people
21st-century New Zealand lawyers
21st-century New Zealand politicians
21st-century New Zealand women politicians
Alumni of the University of Oxford
Human rights lawyers
Members of the New Zealand House of Representatives
New Zealand Labour Party MPs
New Zealand MPs for Auckland electorates
New Zealand people of Sri Lankan Tamil descent
New Zealand women lawyers
Sri Lankan Tamil lawyers
Sri Lankan Tamil politicians
Sri Lankan Tamil women
University of Auckland alumni
Women members of the New Zealand House of Representatives